The 2013 Angola Basketball Super Cup (20th edition) was contested by Recreativo do Libolo, as the 2012 league champion and Primeiro de Agosto, the 2012 cup winner. Primeiro de Agosto was the winner, making it is's 11th title.

The 2013 Women's Super Cup (18th edition) was contested by Interclube, as the 2012 women's league champion and Primeiro de Agosto, the 2012 cup runner-up. Interclube was the winner, making it is's 6th title.

2013 Men's Super Cup

2013 Women's Super Cup

See also
 2013 Angola Basketball Cup
 2013 BAI Basket
 2013 Victorino Cunha Cup

References

Angola Basketball Super Cup seasons
Super Cup